Somonauk Township is one of nineteen townships in DeKalb County, Illinois, USA. As of the 2010 census, its population was 2,101 and it contained 831 housing units.

Geography

Cities, towns, villages
 Sandwich (partial)
 Somonauk (partial)

Unincorporated towns
 Franks at

Cemeteries
 Oak Mound
 Oakridge
 Van Olindas

Airports and landing strips
 George Airport
 Warren Landing Strip

Lakes
 Buck Lake

Demographics

School districts
 Sandwich Community Unit School District 430
 Somonauk Community Unit School District 432

Political districts
 Illinois's 14th congressional district
 State House District 70
 State Senate District 35

References
 
 US Census Bureau 2009 TIGER/Line Shapefiles
 US National Atlas

External links
 City-Data.com
 Illinois State Archives
 Township Officials of Illinois
 DeKalb County Official Site

Townships in DeKalb County, Illinois
1849 establishments in Illinois
Townships in Illinois